Marco António Garcia Pinto (born 22 March 1988) is a Portuguese professional footballer who plays as a goalkeeper.

Club career
Born in Camarate, Loures, Lisbon District, Pinto competed in lower league and amateur football until the age of 28, appearing rarely for all his teams except his last, S.U. 1º de Dezembro. In late May 2016, he left the third division side and signed a two-year deal with C.D. Aves from the Segunda Liga.

On 12 March 2017, ten days shy of his 29th birthday, Pinto made his debut as a professional, coming on as a late substitute for Femi Balogun after Quim was sent off, in a 1–1 away draw against Leixões SC. On 29 May, after a further five appearances to help the club return to the Primeira Liga after an absence of ten years, he renewed his contract until June 2019.

References

External links
 
 
 

1988 births
Living people
Footballers from Lisbon
Portuguese footballers
Association football goalkeepers
Liga Portugal 2 players
Segunda Divisão players
C.F. Os Belenenses players
C.D. Mafra players
GD Beira-Mar players
C.F. Estrela da Amadora players
S.C. Praiense players
C.D. Aves players
SC Mirandela players
GS Loures players
Portugal youth international footballers